Donald Cabral may refer to:

 Donn Cabral (born 1989), American cross country and track runner
 Donald Reid Cabral (1923–2006), Dominican politician and lawyer